The Roteflue (also spelled Rotefluh) is a mountain of the Bernese Alps, overlooking Lake Brienz in the Bernese Oberland. It is located west of the Faulhorn.

References

External links
 Roteflue on Hikr

Mountains of the Alps
Mountains of Switzerland
Mountains of the canton of Bern
Two-thousanders of Switzerland